Anuja Jung (born 6 August 1971) is an Indian sport shooter from New Delhi, India.

Career 
She won the gold medal in the Women's 50m Rifle 3 Positions with 670.7 points and the silver medal in Women's 50m Rifle 3 Positions (Pairs) with Anjali Bhagwat with 1142 points at the 2006 Commonwealth Games.

Personal life
She married Samaresh Jung, a reputed shooting sportsperson from India.

References

Indian female sport shooters
ISSF rifle shooters
Living people
Commonwealth Games silver medallists for India
Commonwealth Games gold medallists for India
Shooters at the 2006 Commonwealth Games
People from Sirmaur district
Sportswomen from Himachal Pradesh
Shooters at the 1998 Asian Games
1971 births
Commonwealth Games medallists in shooting
21st-century Indian women
21st-century Indian people
Sport shooters from Himachal Pradesh
Asian Games competitors for India
Medallists at the 2006 Commonwealth Games